The Technological Educational Institute of Peloponnese (formerly Technological Educational Institute of Kalamata, Τεχνολογικό Εκπαιδευτικό Ίδρυμα Καλαμάτας, TEIKAL) was one of the 15 Technological Educational Institutes in Greece. Its main campus and administrative centre was located in Kalamata and one department was located in Sparta.

History and departments 
It was founded by Presidential Decree 94/1988 as an off-campus faculty of the TEI of Patras.

The first department of the faculty was the Electrical Engineering Department which started its operation in the spring semester of the academic year 1987-88. In 1989, a further Presidential Decree established the TEI of Kalamata as a separate institution, comprising two schools, further subdivided into departments:

 School of Agricultural Technology
 Department of Crop Production, opened in the spring semester of the academic year 1989-90
 Department of Greenhouse Crops and Floriculture, opened in the fall semester of the academic year 1993-94, renamed in 2009 as the Department of Organic Greenhouse Crops and Floriculture
 School of Management and Economy
 Department of Health and Welfare Unit Management, opened in the spring semester of the academic year 1989-90
 Department of Local Government, opened in the fall semester of the academic year 1993-94

Two new departments were founded in 1999, one in each School:

 The Department of Agricultural Product Technology within the School of Agricultural Technology, which began operating in the fall semester of the academic year 2000-2001
 The Department of Finance and Auditing at the School of Management and Economy, which began operating in the fall semester of the academic year 1999-2000.

Ιn 2004, the Department of Information Technology and Telecommunications was established as an off-campus department at Sparta and in 2009, the School of Health and Welfare Professions, comprising the Department of Speech Therapy.

By Law 4610/2019 the Technological Educational Institute of Western Greece was abolished and its School of Engineering was absorbed by the University of Peloponnese.

Schools and departments
The "ATHENA" Reform Plan restructured Higher Education programmes in 2013.

The institute comprises four Schools, consisting of six Departments.

Academic evaluation
In 2016 the external evaluation committee gave TEI of Peloponnese a Positive evaluation.

An external evaluation of all academic departments in Greek universities was conducted by the Hellenic Quality Assurance and Accreditation Agency (HQA).

See also
 University of Peloponnese, a university located in various towns of Peloponnese, established in 2002.
 University of Patras, a university located in Patras, established in 1964.
 List of research institutes in Greece
 List of universities in Greece
 Academic grading in Greece
 Education in Greece

References

External links
 Technological Educational Institute of Peloponnese - Official website 
 Hellenic Quality Assurance and Accreditation Agency (HQA) 
 TEIPEL Internal Quality Assurance Unit   
 "ATHENA" Plan for Higher Education  
 Greek Research and Technology Network (GRNET) 
 Hellenic Academic Libraries Link (HEAL-Link) 
 okeanos (GRNET's cloud service) 
 synnefo - Open Source Cloud Software (GRNET) 

Peloponnese
Kalamata
Educational institutions established in 1988
1988 establishments in Greece
Buildings and structures in Peloponnese (region)